In transportation, heavy lift refers to the handling and installation of heavy items which are indivisible, and of weights generally accepted to be over 100 tons and of widths/heights of more than 100 meters. These oversized items are transported from one place to another (sometimes across country borders), then lifted or installed into place. Characteristic for heavy-lift goods is the absence of standardization, which requires individual transport planning.

Typical cargo 
Typical heavy-lift cargo includes generators, turbines, reactors, boilers, towers, casting, heaters, presses, locomotives, boats, satellites, military personnel and equipment.
In the offshore industry, parts of oil rigs and production platforms are also lifted; some of these are also removed at the end of an installation's working life.  Recent notable lifts have included several of >2000 metric tons in the de-commissioning of the North West Hutton oil field in the British sector of the North Sea.

Transport 

To transport heavy-lift items special trucks or trailers (flatbeds) are used, which are especially suitable due to their large loading area and capacity. For airlift special large-volume cargo aircraft like the Antonov An-225 are employed which can move up to 250 tons of freight. On inland waters barges are often used. Sealift is carried out by special heavy-lift vessels which often possess their own cranes for loading and discharging cargo. Transportation of heavy-lift cargo ranks among the most challenging and complex services in logistics and is handled by specialized companies.

References

Literature 
 Pieper, Marcus: Durchführung eines Schwergut-Transportes mit Binnenschiff und Straßenfahrzeug aus technischer und organisatorischer Sicht. Bremen 1997.
 Internationale Transport-Zeitschrift; 2008, 13/14. Spezial: Break Bulk, Schwergut-Special

Freight transport